Duranta is a genus of flowering plants in the verbena family, Verbenaceae. It contains 17 species of shrubs and small trees that are native from southern Florida to Mexico and South America. They are commonly cultivated as hedges and ornamental plants.

Duranta is registered as an invasive weed by many councils of Australia. It is a prolific, fast growing weed that is spread by birds from domestic areas to natural reserves. It was introduced and marketed as a hedge plant some years ago. Many people now fight to keep this thorny pest under control. It is highly ranked in the most invasive weeds in Australia.

Selected species
Duranta dombeyana Moldenke
Duranta erecta L.
Duranta mutisii
Duranta serratifolia (Griseb.) Kuntze
Duranta stenostachya Tod.
Duranta triacantha Juss.

Gallery

References

Verbenaceae
Verbenaceae genera
Garden plants